Luca Rinaldi (died 1552) was a Roman Catholic prelate who served as Bishop of Gravina di Puglia (1518–1552).

Biography
In December 1518, Luca Rinaldi was appointed during the papacy of Pope Leo X as Bishop of Gravina di Puglia.
He served as Bishop of Gravina di Puglia until his death in 1552.

References

External links and additional sources
 (for Chronology of Bishops) 
 (for Chronology of Bishops) 

16th-century Italian Roman Catholic bishops
Bishops appointed by Pope Leo X
1552 deaths
Dominican bishops